Peter the Great is a 1937-1938 Soviet two-part historical biographical film, shot on the Order of Lenin from Leningrad film studio Lenfilm director Vladimir Petrov on the eponymous play by Aleksey Nikolayevich Tolstoy's devoted to the life and activity of the Russian Emperor Peter I.

Cast 
 Nikolai Simonov as Tsar Pyotr I
 Mikhail Zharov as Alexander Danilovich Menshikov
 Nikolay Cherkasov as  Prince Alexei
 Mikhail Tarkhanov as Field Marshal Boris Sheremetev
 Viktor Dobrovolsky as Yaguzhinsky, an officer / Fedka, a debtor
 Alla Tarasova as Catherine, a peasant girl
 Konstantin Gibshman as Buinosov, the boyar  
 Nikolai Orlov as Yemov
 Fyodor Bogdanov as Foundry Owner 
 Vladimir Gardin as Pyotr Andreyevich Tolstoy

Awards
 Prize at an exhibition in Paris (1937) 
 Stalin Prize (1941) I Class – Mikhail Zharov, Vladimir Petrov, Nikolay Simonov

External links
  Peter the Great I
   Peter the Great II

1937 films
1938 films
1930s biographical drama films
Soviet biographical drama films
Russian biographical drama films
1930s historical drama films
Soviet historical drama films
Russian historical drama films
Films set in Russia
Biographical films about Russian royalty
Cultural depictions of Charles XII of Sweden
Cultural depictions of Ivan Mazepa
Cultural depictions of Peter the Great
Soviet black-and-white films
Lenfilm films
Russian black-and-white films
1930s Russian-language films